Virginijus Baltušnikas  (born 22 October 1968 in Panevėžys) is a retired Lithuanian professional football player who played for FK Žalgiris Vilnius in the Soviet Top League and Lithuanian A Lyga as well as FC Lokomotiv Nizhny Novgorod the Russian Premier League.

Baltušnikas made 42 appearances for the Lithuania national football team, scoring nine goals.

Honours
 Baltic Cup
 1992

References

External links
 
 
 

1968 births
Sportspeople from Panevėžys
Living people
Soviet footballers
Lithuanian footballers
Lithuania international footballers
FK Žalgiris players
Pakhtakor Tashkent FK players
1. FC Magdeburg players
Lithuanian expatriate footballers
Expatriate footballers in Germany
Expatriate footballers in Russia
FC Lokomotiv Nizhny Novgorod players
Soviet Top League players
Russian Premier League players
Association football defenders
FK Ekranas players